The second season of the American reality show Bar Rescue premiered on July 29 to September 30, 2012 on Spike, consisting of a total of 10 episodes. The series stars renown nightlife consultant Jon Taffer who offers his professional expertise plus renovations and equipment to desperately failing bars in order to save them from closing.

Experts
 Jon Taffer – Host/Star/Bar Consultant
 Nicole Taffer – Host's Wife/Marketing/Recon Spy
 Samantha "Sam" Taffer – Host's Daughter/Mixologist/Recon Spy

Chefs
 Josh Capon
 Brian Duffy
 Keith Jones
 Aaron McCargo

Mixologists
 Elayne Duke
 Terrelle Treco
 Chris Cardone
 Jenny Costa
 Kat Munday
 Joe Meyer
 Peter O'Connor
 Michael Tipps
 Jason Bran
 Joseph Brooke

Other special experts
Nancy Hadley – Concept/Interior Design
Jessie Barnes – Hospitality
DJ Green Lantern – DJ

Production
On September 14, 2011, Spike renewed Bar Rescue for a second season for Summer 2012.

Season 2 is best known for the season premiere where Jon attempted to rescue the train wreck that was a pirate themed bar called Piratz Tavern. The bar quickly undid all of Taffer's drastic changes shortly after their episode was filmed. The unsuccessful pirate-themed bar was rebranded Corporate Bar and Grill by Taffer but the change was short-lived, as the bar was again going with the pirate theme by the time the episode aired. The owner even released a YouTube video of the new "Corporate" sign created by Taffer's team being burned and shot at in effigy called Piratz Revenge which was heavily disliked by YouTube viewers and currently has only a positive rating of 4%. "If you had a pirate concept that had failed for five years and had a new concept, would you go back to the concept that failed for five years or try something new?("We like pirates",they said) It defies logic that someone would go back to a (failed) concept just because they don't like the new name", said Taffer of their decision("We still like pirates",they commented). The owners blamed the "negative publicity" on the show. Piratz was revisited as part of the Back to the Bar episode, where Taffer graded the bar an "epic fail"; the owner wanted to seek a second rescue. Within a week of the episode's airing, however, Piratz decided to close its doors for good. The owners resurfaced in season four where Jon brought them and their daughter in to do recon for Freaki Tiki. In addition, they confirmed to him in another Back to the Bar episode that they are opening up a new bar in Florida called Bar Refuge.

Rock band Halestorm made an appearance during the grand opening of the now defunct Fairfield bar America Live (formerly known as Win, Place or Show).

Episodes

Notes

References

External links
 
 Bar Rescue Updates — Unaffiliated site that keeps track of bars being open or closed and has updates for each bar

Bar Rescue

2012 American television seasons